Columnea purpurata is a species of Gesneriaceae that is native to Costa Rica, Colombia, and Belize.

References

External links
 
 

purpurata
Plants described in 1865
Flora of Costa Rica